was a landing craft carrier with a small flight deck built for the Imperial Japanese Army during World War II. Launched and completed in early 1945, the ship saw no significant action.

Construction
Kumano Maru was laid down at the Hitachi Shipbuilding yard at Innoshima as a standard Type M wartime cargo ship. The ship was taken over by the Army during construction, redesigned as a landing craft transport, and designated a Type B landing ship. It could carry up to a dozen  and thirteen  landing craft in its hold. They were launched on rails through two large doors in the stern.

The ship was also designed to transport anywhere from 8 to 37 aircraft, depending on their size and the number of landing craft aboard. A  flight deck was mounted above the main deck with an elevator aft. This permitted the stored aircraft to be flown off the ship to onshore airfields. The deck was not large enough to allow aircraft to land. The ship's funnel was mounted on the starboard side and vented horizontally outward to keep the flight deck clear.

Operational history

Kumano Maru was launched 28 January 1945 and completed on 31 March. She survived the war, and was used until 1947 to repatriate Japanese forces abroad. The ship was sold to Kawasaki Kisen K. K. Line in 1947 and converted to a conventional merchant ship. Afterward, she was scrapped in 1948.

Notes

Bibliography
 
 
 
 
 
 

Ships built by Hitachi Zosen Corporation
1945 ships
Amphibious warfare vessels
Postwar Japan
Kawasaki Heavy Industries